Hrvatski nogometni klub Grude, or simply HNK Grude, is a professional football club, based in Grude, Bosnia and Herzegovina. The club plays in the Second League of the Federation of Bosnia and Herzegovina.

History

Foundation of NK Bekija (1959-1999) 
HNK Grude was founded in 1959 as NK Bekija by the members of youth sports organization Bekija the club's first official game was against Mladost in 1959.

HNK Grude era (1999-present) 
In 1999 after a meeting in Hotel Grude, the club was renamed as  In 2009 HNK Grude celebrated 50 years of foundation with a friendly match against GNK Dinamo Zagreb. HNK Grude is the oldest sports club in Grude. They spent one season at Bosnia and Hercegovina's highest level, in 2001–02.

Honours

Domestic

League
First League of the Federation of Bosnia and Herzegovina:
 Winners (1): 2000–01

Club seasons
Source:

References

Second League of the Federation of Bosnia and Herzegovina
Football clubs in Bosnia and Herzegovina
Association football clubs established in 1959
1959 establishments in Bosnia and Herzegovina
Croatian football clubs in Bosnia and Herzegovina